The Tri-Cities is an area of Nebraska consisting of the cities of Grand Island, Hastings, and Kearney. It has a population of around 160,000.

References 

Geography of Nebraska